Syllepis hortalis is a moth in the family Crambidae. It was described by Francis Walker in 1859. It is found in Argentina, Colombia, Brazil, Panama, Costa Rica and Mexico.

References

Moths described in 1859
Spilomelinae